Mark Francis may refer to:

 Mark Francis (English footballer) (born 1994), English footballer
 Mark Francis (soccer) (born 1960), English-American soccer midfielder
 Mark Francis (artist) (born 1962), Irish painter
 Mark-Francis Vandelli (born 1988), British television personality

See also
 Mark Lewis-Francis (born 1982), British athlete
 Mark Francois (born 1965), English politician